The Logic of Pleasure is the ninth studio album by Trance duo Blank & Jones. It was released in 2008.
Regular edition Soundcolours #SC 0002.

Track listing
"Consequences" - feat. Vanessa Daou - 6:52
"Miracle Cure" - feat. Bernard Sumner - 3:49
"The Night Starts Here (A Blank & Jones Remix)" - by Stars - 3:32
"So Cold" - feat. Trademark; Vocals by Oliver Horton - 5:42
"California Sunset" - 8:16
"Manifesto" - feat. Vanessa Daou - 5:38
"Where You Belong" - feat. Bobo - 7:04
"Breakout" - 6:26
"Heart Of Wax" - feat. Vanessa Daou - 6:43
"Catwalk" - 9:09
"Don't Stop" - feat. Claudia Brücken - 6:43

The Logic Of Pleasure (Limited Edition)
Soundcolours #SC 0003, Double CD, cardboard box.

Track listing
CD1 - The Logic Of Pleasure
Same as regular edition.

CD2 - Forever
"Rumble" - 7:42
"Unknown Treasure (Ambient Mix)" - feat. Claudia Brücken - 6:10
"Blue Moon" - 5:03
"Loneliness" - feat. Bobo - 5:27
"Daydreamin'" - 6:06
"Revealed (Late Night Dub)" - feat. Steve Kilbey - 5:14
"Florent 2 A.M." - 3:47

Blank & Jones albums
2008 albums